National Route 43 is a national highway in South Korea connecting Sejong City to Kosong County (North Korea). It was established on 31 August 1971.

Main stopovers

South Korea section
 Sejong City
 Areum-dong - Goun-dong - Yeongi-myeon - Janggun-myeon
 South Chungcheong Province
 Gongju - Cheonan
 Sejong City
 Jeonui-myeon
 South Chungcheong Province
 Cheonan
 Sejong City
 Sojeong-myeon
 South Chungcheong Province
 Cheonan - Asan
 Gyeonggi Province
 Pyeongtaek - Hwaseong - Suwon - Yongin - Suwon - Yongin - Gwangju - Hanam
 Seoul 
 Gangdong District
 Gyeonggi Province
 Hanam
 Seoul
 Gangdong District - Songpa District - Gangdong District - Cheonho Bridge - Gwangjin District
 Gyeonggi Province
 Guri - Namyangju - Uijeongbu - Pocheon
 Gangwon Province
 Cheorwon County

North Korea section
 Kangwon Province
 Kumsong County - Hoeyang County - Kosong County

Major intersections

 (■): Motorway
IS: Intersection, IC: Interchange

Sejong City·South Chungcheong Province

Gyeonggi Province (South Seoul)

Seoul

Gyeonggi Province (North Seoul)

Gangwon Province

References

43
Roads in Sejong
Roads in South Chungcheong
Roads in Gyeonggi
Roads in Seoul
Roads in Gangwon